Shahchoi pass (el. 14,700 ft.) is a high mountain pass in the Ishkoman Valley, Pakistan. It is also called Shahchoi An.

Mountain passes of Gilgit-Baltistan